The 1905 North Carolina Tar Heels football team represented the University of North Carolina at Chapel Hill in the 1905 college football season. The team captain for the 1905 season was Foy Roberson.

Schedule

References

North Carolina
North Carolina Tar Heels football seasons
North Carolina Tar Heels football